Star Time is a four-CD box set by American musician James Brown. Released in May 1991 by Polydor Records, its contents span most of the length of his career up to the time of its release, starting in 1956 with his first hit record, "Please, Please, Please", and ending with "Unity", his 1984 collaboration with Afrika Bambaataa. Writing in 2007, Robert Christgau described it as "the finest box set ever released... as essential a package as the biz has ever hawked, not just because it's James Brown, but because compilers Cliff White and Harry Weinger invested so much care and knowledge in it." Its title comes from the question Brown's announcer would ask concert audiences, as heard on the album Live at the Apollo: "Are you ready for star time?"

Star Time'''s liner notes, written by Cliff White, Harry Weinger, Nelson George, Alan Leeds, and Brown himself, won a 1991 Grammy Award for Best Album Notes. The notes also include a discography and a one-page comic by Mary Fleener, a visual interpretation of the song "I Got You (I Feel Good)."

In 2003, the album was ranked number 79 on Rolling Stone magazine's list of the 500 greatest albums of all time. It was the second-highest ranking box set on the list. In 2012, it moved up to 75, while in its 2020 revision, it moved to number 54.

Track listing
Adapted from CD booklet's liner notes.

Certifications

See also
 20 All-Time Greatest Hits!''

References

Notes

External links 

 Rolling Stone story
 Overview at MP3.com

James Brown compilation albums
1991 compilation albums
Polydor Records compilation albums
The Famous Flames albums